Presidential elections were held in Sudan between 14 and 25 April 1983. Jaafar Nimeiry was the only candidate, and received 99.6% of the vote.

Results

References

1983 in Sudan
Presidential elections in Sudan
Sudan
Single-candidate elections
Election and referendum articles with incomplete results